Watzke is a German-language surname. Notable people with the surname include:
 Hans Watzke (1932–2014), German politician
 Hans-Joachim Watzke (born 1959), German entrepreneur and football CEO
 Helen Slater (born 1963), American actress, married name Helen Watzke
 Josef Vacke (1907–1987), Czech artist
 King Watzke (1872–1919), American violinist and bandleader
 Rudolf Watzke (1892–1972), German operatic and concert singer

German-language surnames